"New Song" is the debut single by musician Howard Jones, released in August 1983. The single reached number three on the UK Singles Chart, spending 20 weeks in the Top 75. On the UK seven-inch single, the song's lyrics are printed in a spiral on the A-side label, with all the credits printed on the B-side. It was released in the US in early 1984, peaking at #27 on the Billboard Hot 100 chart. The track later appeared on Jones' debut album Human's Lib.

Background

Howard Jones said, "In 'New Song,' I wanted a song that was like my manifesto, like why I wanted to be in the business and why I wanted to write songs in the first place. I was working in the factory at the time - I was doing the gigs at night and I was working in the factory. And I wanted to say to people, 'You can. It is possible to do what you really want to do if you've got enough guts and determination. You can do what you're really good at in this life if you set your mind to it.' And so really that's what that song's about. It's about letting go of fear and seeing both sides of an argument and throwing off the things that hold you back mentally."

The single's B-side was titled "Change the Man". The twelve-inch single featured an extended version of "New Song" together with "Change the Man" and the original studio version of "Conditioning", which would be re-recorded for Human's Lib. "New Song" itself was later re-recorded for The 12" Album, in a version denoted "New Version". This featured a lot of multi-layered piano, in contrast to the austere synthesizer sound of the original seven and twelve-inch versions.

Equipment used for the song includes a Roland Juno-60 synthesizer, Moog Memorymoog synthesizer, and an E-mu Drumulator drum machine.

DJ Mike Read refused to play "New Song", suggesting it was too similar to the song "Solsbury Hill" by Peter Gabriel. When asked about the similarity in a 2011 interview, Jones denied using "Solsbury Hill" as inspiration:

Music video 
The video opens at a pickle plant, where Jones's character works as a caretaker. As the owner arrives on the site,  Howard strips off his uniform coveralls and begins to sing to his colleagues. One of them, a man wearing black/white theatrical makeup, removes his coveralls and begins to dance through the plant. As the boss begins to mop the floor, Howard, the dancer, and several employees pile into his luxury car and drive away.  Howard and the dancer next visit an Underground station (specifically Holborn Station) to perform for the patrons, then visit a window cleaner and get him to take a break from his work. Finally, the two arrive at a school and interrupt a class of unruly students, who follow them outside to play on the grass, followed by their teacher.

Track listing 
7" vinyl (UK)
"New Song" (Jones) – 4:16
"Change the Man" (Jones) – 4:30

7" vinyl (US)
"New Song" (Jones) – 4:16
"Conditioning" (Jones/Bryant) – 4:02

12" vinyl
"New Song" (Extended Mix) (Jones) – 5:21
"Change the Man" (Jones) – 4:30
"Conditioning" (Jones/Bryant) – 4:55

Chart performance

References

External links 
The official Howard Jones website discography

1983 debut singles
1984 singles
Howard Jones (English musician) songs
Songs written by Howard Jones (English musician)
Song recordings produced by Colin Thurston
1983 songs